The Europa Jeep was a multinational military vehicle project that was ultimately abandoned before it could enter production.

During the 1960s, several European governments began cooperating on development of a vehicle known as the Europa Jeep, a lightweight, amphibious four wheel drive vehicle that could be mass-produced for use by various national military and government groups. Development of the vehicle proved time-consuming, however, and by 1979 the project had been abandoned.

The West German government was in need of a limited number of light, inexpensive, durable transport vehicles that could fulfill their basic needs while the Europa Jeep was being developed and put into production. Volkswagen was instead instructed by the West German government to create the Volkswagen 181. After the abandonment of the Europa Jeep a number of NATO countries also adopted the 181.

The Bundeswehr Museum of German Defense Technology in Koblenz has protypes of Europa Jeeps in the exhibition.

External links

Off-road vehicles
Wheeled amphibious vehicles
Amphibious military vehicles